Nobuea is a genus of tropical land snails  with an operculum, terrestrial gastropod mollusks in the family Cyclophoridae.

Species
Species within the genus Nobuea include:
Nobuea elegantistriata Kuroda & Miyanaga, 1943
Nobuea kurodai
Nobuea sp. of Kimura & Noseworthy (2020)

References

Further reading 
  Minato H. & Tada A. (1978). "日本新記録のノブエガイ属の新種 "Nobuea, A Genus of Operculate Gastropoda New to Japan (Mesogastropoda; Diplommatinidae)". Venus 36(4) 168-170. CiNii.

Cyclophoridae
Taxonomy articles created by Polbot